Bandwidth expansion is a technique for widening the bandwidth or the resonances in an LPC filter. This is done by moving all the poles towards the origin by a constant factor . The bandwidth-expanded filter  can be easily derived from the original filter  by:

Let  be expressed as:

The bandwidth-expanded filter can be expressed as:

The simplicity of this transformation makes it attractive, especially in CELP coding of speech, where it is often used for the perceptual noise weighting and/or to stabilize the LPC analysis. However, when it comes to stabilizing the LPC analysis, lag windowing is often preferred to bandwidth expansion.

References 
P. Kabal, "Ill-Conditioning and Bandwidth Expansion in Linear Prediction of Speech", Proc. IEEE Int. Conf. Acoustics, Speech, Signal Processing, pp. I-824-I-827, 2003.

Signal processing